The term Japhetites (in adjective form Japhethitic or Japhetic) refers to the descendants of Japheth, one of the three sons of Noah in the Bible. The term has been adopted in ethnological and linguistic writing from the 18th to the 20th century but has now become obsolete.

In medieval ethnography, the world was believed to have been divided into three large-scale groupings, corresponding to the three classical continents: the Semitic peoples of Asia, the Hamitic peoples of Africa and the Japhetic peoples of Europe.

The term has been used in modern times as a designation in physical anthropology, ethnography and comparative linguistics. In anthropology, it was used in a racial sense for white people (the Caucasian race). In linguistics, it was used as a term for the Indo-European languages. These uses are now mostly obsolete. In a linguistic sense, only the Semitic peoples form a well-defined family. The Indo-European group is no longer known as "Japhetite", and the Hamitic group is now recognized as paraphyletic within the Afro-Asiatic family.

Among Muslim historians, Japheth is usually regarded as the ancestor of the Gog and Magog tribes, and, at times, of the Turks, Khazars, and Slavs.

Biblical genealogy

In the Genesis, Japheth is mentioned as one of the three sons of Noah. The other two sons of Noah, Shem and Ham, are the eponymous ancestors of the Semites and the Hamites, respectively. In the Biblical Table of Nations (Genesis ), seven sons and seven grandsons of Japheth are mentioned:
 Gomer
 Ashkenaz
 Riphath
 Togarmah
 Magog
 Madai
 Javan
 Elishah
 Tarshish
 Kittim
 Dodanim
 Tubal
 Meshech
 Tiras

The intended ethnic identity of these "descendants of Japheth" is not certain; however, over history, they have been identified by Biblical scholars with various historical nations who were deemed to be descendants of Japheth and his sons — a practice dating back at least to the classical Jewish-Greek encounters. For example, the Roman Jewish historian Josephus states in the Antiquities of the Jews, I.VI.122 (Whiston) that:
Japhet, the son of Noah, had seven sons: they inhabited so, that, beginning at the mountains Taurus and Amanus, they proceeded along Asia, as far as the river Tanais (Don), and along Europe to Cadiz; and settling themselves on the lands which they light upon, which none had inhabited before, they called the nations by their own names.

Ancient and medieval ethnography

Pseudo-Philo
An ancient, relatively obscure text known as Pseudo-Philo and thought to have been originally written ca. 70 AD, contains an expanded genealogy that is seemingly garbled from that of Genesis, and also different from the much later one found in the Book of Jasher:

Sons of Japheth: "Gomer, Magog, and Madai, Nidiazech, Tubal, Mocteras, Cenez, Riphath, and Thogorma, Elisa, Dessin, Cethin, Tudant."
Sons of Gomer: Thelez, Lud, Deberlet.
Sons of Magog: Cesse, Thipha, Pharuta, Ammiel, Phimei, Goloza, Samanach.
Sons of Duden: Sallus, Phelucta Phallita.
Sons of Tubal: Phanatonova, Eteva.
Sons of Tyras: Maac, Tabel, Ballana, Samplameac, Elaz.
Sons of Mellech: Amboradat, Urach, Bosara.
Sons of Ascenez: Jubal, Zaraddana, Anac.
Sons of Heri: Phuddet, Doad, Dephadzeat, Enoc.
Sons of Togorma: Abiud, Saphath, Asapli, Zepthir.
Sons of Elisa: Etzaac, Zenez, Mastisa, Rira.
Sons of Zepti: Macziel, Temna, Aela, Phinon.
Sons of Tessis: Meccul, Loon, Zelataban.
Sons of Duodennin: Itheb, Beath, Phenech.

Later writers
Some of the nations that various later writers (including Jerome and Isidore of Seville, as well as other traditional accounts) have attempted to describe as Japhetites are listed below:

 Gomer: Scythians, Cimmerians Phrygians, Turks (without Avars and Tatars), Bulgars, Armenians (including most of other related people in Caucasus), Welsh, Picts, Germanic People (excluding North Germanic), Teutons (Germanic peoples), Celts
 Magog: Scythians, Goths, Swedes, Scandinavians, Finns, Huns, Slavs (not including East Slavs, Bulgarians and Macedonians), Magyars (Hungarians), Irish, Armenians (including most of other related people in Caucasus)
 Madai: Mitanni, Mannai, Medes, more generally Persians or even their relatives
 Javan: Ionians (Greeks), Tartessians, Ancient Grecians
 Tubal: Tabali, Circassians, Irish, Georgians (including most of other related people in Caucasus), Illyrians, Italics (not including Latin who are of Etruscan origin), Iberians, Basques
Meshech: East Slavs (including Russians), Phrygians (possible), Moschoi, Meskheti, Georgians, Armenians, Illyrians, Irish
 Tiras: Thracians, Etruscans (Romans), Romanians

Renaissance to Early Modern ethnography

Book of Jasher
The Book of Jasher, a midrash (Jewish elaboration of the biblical text) first printed in 1625, ostensibly based on an earlier edition of 1552, provides some new names for Japheth's grandchildren. 
Gomer (sons were Ashkenaz, Riphath and Togarmah)
Magog (sons were Elichanaf and Lubal) 
Madai (sons were Achon, Zeelo, Chazoni and Lot)
Javan (sons were Elishah, Tarshish, Kittim and Dodanim)
Tubal (sons were Ariphi, Kesed and Taari)
Meshech (sons were Dedon, Zaron and Shebashni) 
Tiras (sons were Benib, Gera, Lupirion and Gilak)

Anthropology

The term Caucasian as a racial label for Europeans derives in part from the assumption that the tribe of Japheth developed its distinctive racial characteristics in the Caucasus area, having migrated there from Mount Ararat before populating Europe. In the same vein, Georgian national histories associated Japheth's sons with certain ancient tribes of the Caucasus area, called Tubals (Tabals, Tibarenoi in Greek) and Meshechs (Meshekhs/Mosokhs, Moschoi in Greek), who they claimed represented ancient pre-Indo-European and non-Semitic, possibly "Proto-Iberian", tribes of Asia Minor of the 3rd-1st millennia BC. This theory influenced the use of the term Japhetic in the linguistic theories of Nikolai Marr (see below). 
 
During the eighteenth and nineteenth centuries, the Biblical statement attributed to Noah that "God shall enlarge Japheth" (Genesis 9:27) was used by some preachers as a justification for the "enlargement" of European territories through imperialism, which they interpreted as part of God's plan for the world. The subjugation of Africans was similarly justified by the curse of Ham.

Linguistics

The term Japhetic was also applied by William Jones, Rasmus Rask and others to what is now known as the Indo-European language group.

The term was used in a different sense by the Soviet linguist Nicholas Marr, in his Japhetic theory, which was intended to demonstrate that the languages of the Caucasus formed part of a once-widespread pre-Indo-European language group.

See also
 
 Aryan
 Gog and Magog
 Hephthalites
 Indo-Scythians
 Proto-Indo-Europeans

References

Further reading

External links
 Easton Bible dictionary about Japheth
 Smith's Bible Dictionary about Japheth
 International Standard Bible Encyclopedia: Japheth
 Japheth in the Jewish Encyclopedia

Indo-European studies
Historical definitions of race